Heather Ann Nauert (born January 27, 1970) is an American broadcast journalist and former government official who served as Spokesperson for the United States Department of State in the Donald Trump administration from 2017 to 2019. She is a senior fellow at the Hudson Institute, a conservative think tank.

Prior to her positions at the Department of State, she worked as an ABC News correspondent and news presenter on the Fox News program Fox & Friends. Nauert was also Acting Under Secretary of State for Public Diplomacy and Public Affairs in the Trump administration from March to October 2018. In 2019, Trump appointed Nauert to the J. William Fulbright Foreign Scholarship Board and the President's Commission on White House Fellowships.

Early life
Nauert is a native of Rockford, Illinois. Her father, Peter Nauert, was an executive in the insurance industry. She has three brothers: Justin, Jonathan, and Joseph.

Nauert attended Keith Country Day School in Rockford, Illinois, Pine Manor College in Chestnut Hill, Massachusetts, and then Arizona State University. After landing an internship hosting a country music video program in Washington, D.C., she stayed there to finish school, earning her Bachelor of Arts degree in communications from Mount Vernon College for Women. She received her master's degree in journalism from Columbia University.

Career

Broadcast journalism
In 1996, Nauert was a reporter for the syndicated business program First Business. She worked for Fox News from 1998 to 2005, first as a contributor for three years and then as a correspondent for four years. During her time as a correspondent, she regularly contributed to The Big Story.

From 2005 to 2007, Nauert held positions at several news organizations, including ABC News as a general assignment correspondent, where she contributed to ABC World News Tonight, Good Morning America, and Nightline. While at ABC, she was nominated for an Emmy Award for her work on the special series 13 Around the World. In 2007, Nauert returned to Fox News as co-host with John Gibson of the weekday edition of The Big Story until it was cancelled in 2008.

Nauert also co-anchored the newscasts Good Day Early Call and Good Day New York Wake Up with co-anchor Steve Lacy weekday mornings for Fox Broadcasting Company owned-and-operated station WNYW in New York City. In October 2012, Nauert left Good Day Wake Up and became a news presenter for Fox & Friends. According to the Washington Post, Nauert "broadcast just about every right-wing talking-point under the sun" when she was a presenter on Fox News. She referred to illegal immigrant students as "illegals" and cited CDC studies that immigrant children were bringing disease like tuberculosis.

She has appeared on two fictional TV shows in which she played herself: Brother's Keeper (1 episode, 1999) and 24 (3 episodes, 2010).

United States Department of State

On April 24, 2017, the United States Department of State announced that Nauert would be the new State Department spokesperson, her first role in government. She held her first press briefing in that role five weeks later, on June 6, 2017. Following the dismissal of Steve Goldstein on March 13, 2018, Nauert was named acting Under Secretary of State for Public Diplomacy and Public Affairs, the fourth ranking position in the State Department. In that role, she oversaw a budget of $1.2 billion and almost a thousand employees. During her time in the State Department, Nauert did not develop a close relationship with Secretary of State Rex Tillerson, but after Tillerson's dismissal, she became part of Mike Pompeo's inner circle when he took over as Secretary of State.

Nauert voiced opposition to the Iraqi Kurdistan's decision to hold an independence referendum in September 2017.

When the United States withdrew from Unesco, Nauert was quoted by the New York Times as saying, "We were in arrears to the tune of $550 million or so, and so the question is, do we want to pay that money? With this anti-Israel bias that's long documented on the part of Unesco, that needs to come to an end."

In April 2018, Nauert voiced support for Saudi Arabian-led intervention in Yemen. She also condemned "Iran's malign influence" in Yemen. In May 2018, Nauert said in response to the Gaza border protests: "We oppose actions against Israel at the International Criminal Court (...) because it does not help the cause for peace."

Nauert called for the release of Ukrainian political prisoners in Russia such as Oleg Sentsov, Stanislav Klykh, Oleksandr Shumkov and Volodymyr Balukh.

Nauert condemned the genocide of the Rohingya Muslim minority in Myanmar, saying: "We will continue to hold those responsible accountable."  

In August 2018, Canada called for the immediate release of Saudi human rights activist Raif Badawi and his sister, Samar Badawi. In response to Canada's criticism, Saudi Arabia expelled the Ambassador of Canada and froze trade with Canada, leading to a decline in Canada–Saudi Arabia relations. Nauert said: "It is up for the Government of Saudi Arabia and the Canadians to work this out. Both sides need to diplomatically resolve this together. We cannot do it for them."

Nauert criticized China's re-education camps and human rights violations against ethnic Uyghurs and other predominantly Muslim ethnic minorities in China's north-western province of Xinjiang. She said that "credible reports indicate that individuals sent by Chinese authorities to detention centers since April 2017 number at least in the hundreds of thousands, and possibly millions."

In February 2019, it was reported that she did not intend to return to work as State Department spokeswoman following her withdrawal from consideration as U.N. ambassador.

Proposed nomination as United States Ambassador to the United Nations 
On December 7, 2018, Trump announced that he would nominate Nauert to be United States Ambassador to the United Nations. He told reporters that Nauert was "excellent," adding, "She’s been a supporter for a long time."  News outlets noted that she had risen rapidly through the ranks of the State Department and that she had little official foreign policy experience (though in her time as a reporter she had interviewed numerous foreign officials and world leaders). Politico wrote, "Less than two years ago, Heather Nauert was conducting interviews on 'Fox and Friends.' Now, she’s preparing to navigate the world’s raging geopolitical issues." A Washington Post headline read, "Heather Nauert once cited D-Day in 'long history' of U.S.-German relations. Now she’s headed to the U.N."

Despite Trump's announcement, he never nominated Nauert. In filling out paperwork for the appointment, she revealed that she had employed a nanny who, though she was in the country legally, lacked a proper work visa. Citing family considerations, Nauert withdrew her name from consideration on February 16, 2019. Trump then nominated Ambassador Kelly Craft, who became the 30th United States Ambassador to the United Nations.

J. William Fulbright Foreign Scholarship Board 
On March 29, 2019, President Trump appointed Nauert to serve as a member on the J. William Fulbright Foreign Scholarship Board. The 12-member board meets in Washington, D.C. and is responsible for supervising the Fulbright program.

Personal life
Nauert is married to Scott Norby, managing director of private credit and equity for Morgan Stanley, who previously held positions at National Veterinary Associates, UBS, Goldman Sachs, and Cargill. The couple have two sons and reside in New York.

References

External links

 "Nauert, Heather: Biography". U.S. Department of State.
 "Nauert, Heather: Biography on IMDB"
 
 Appearances on C-SPAN

1970 births
ABC News personalities
American political commentators
American television news anchors
Columbia University Graduate School of Journalism alumni
Fox News people
Mount Vernon Seminary and College alumni
Journalists from Illinois
Living people
People from Rockford, Illinois
Pine Manor College alumni
Rejected or withdrawn nominees to the United States Executive Cabinet
Trump administration personnel
United States Department of State spokespeople
United States Under Secretaries of State
Illinois Republicans